The Christmas Song is an EP by American country artist Jamey Johnson. It was released on November 19, 2014 as the first release by Johnson's own label, Big Gassed Records.

The album features four covers of Christmas- and holiday-themed songs, in addition to an original composition by Johnson, "South Alabam Christmas". The song is the first new original composition by Johnson since The Guitar Song was released in 2010.

Track listing

Chart performance

References

2014 debut EPs
2014 Christmas albums
Jamey Johnson albums
Christmas albums by American artists
Country Christmas albums
Albums produced by Dave Cobb
Christmas EPs